The 2014 Campeonato Paraibano de Futebol was the 104th edition of Paraíba's top professional football league. The competition ran from 12 January to 29 June. The champions, for the 27th time, were Botafogo-PB.

Format
The competition retained the same format as 2013, being divided into three stages.

In the first stage, the eight teams faced each other home and away for a total of 14 games. The bottom two teams were relegated to the second division. The top two teams in this stage automatically qualified for the final stage. Campinense and Treze were exempted from this phase due to their involvement in Copa do Nordeste.

In the second stage, Botafogo-PB and Treze joined the six remaining teams from the first stage, and the eight teams faced each other home and away for a total of 14 games. The top two teams from this stage, who had not already qualified from the first stage, qualified for the final stage.

In the final stage, the four teams played each other in a semi-final over two legs (winner of first stage vs second best qualifier of second stage; best qualifier of second stage vs runner up of first stage). The winners played each other in a final over two legs.

Qualification
The champions qualified to participate in the 2016 Copa do Brasil. The best placed team (other than Botafogo-PB) qualified to participate in the 2015 Campeonato Brasileiro Série D. The champions and vice champions qualified to participate in the 2016 Copa do Nordeste.

Participating teams
On 11 November 2013, the Paraíba Football Federation announced that Esporte and Nacional, the two clubs from Patos, had withdrawn from the competition due to financial concerns. As a result, the teams finishing third and fourth in the 2013 Second Division - Queimadense and Sport Campina - were included in the competition.

First stage

Standings

Second stage

Standings

Final stage

References

Paraíba
2014